The Palestinian Child Arts Center, or PCAC, is a non-governmental, non-profit organization founded in 1994 in Hebron, Palestine. Its activities primarily involve the intellectual development of Palestinian children, and to reinforce a positive role for the child within Palestinian society and culture.

The violent context within which the children have been raised has affected their behavior and life. After the Mosque of Abraham massacre in February 1994 some children were traumatized and exhibited drastic behavioral changes. The programs run by PCAC are designed to gradually allow a child to resume normal life. The center's mission is to fulfill the promise in its slogan, Towards a creative Palestinian child.

Objectives
The Palestinian Child Arts Center conducts various activities:

 preparation of educational programs for children
 modernizing and updating childhood development programs for professionals
 development of other programs for children in conjunction with other organizations to create a communal educational culture
 conduct research on the violation of the rights of children, and publish bulletins and reports to defend those rights
 to coordinate and cooperate with other organizations that focus on children
 develop relationships with other Arab and international organizations whose focus is children and their rights

Programs
The centre offers numerous activities and services for both children and adults.

Children's programs:
 annual Amal Al Ghad (Hope of Tomorrow), a program targeting children ages 6–12
 library
 arts and crafts lessons
 music courses
 young leaders program, for teens ages 14–18 <-- or possibly teenage boys only? -->
 puppet theater
 electronic games
 festivals
 exhibitions

Adult programs:
 leader's recruiting
 public education - seminars, lectures, conferences and exhibits related to children
 qualifying kindergarten teachers
 qualifying advisors for summer camps

Footnotes

External links
 The Palestinian Child Arts Center website

Palestinian charities
Hebron
Children's charities
1994 establishments in the Palestinian territories
Organizations established in 1994